Kim Won-sik (born 5 November 1991) is a South Korean football player who plays for Seoul E-Land FC.

Club career
He trained in Reading Academy by KFA overseas training program and played for Pau in the Championnat de France Amateurs.

FC Seoul
He joined FC Seoul as 2012 K League draft pick.

References

External links
 

1991 births
Living people
People from Seoul
South Korean footballers
South Korean expatriate footballers
Association football defenders
Association football midfielders
Pau FC players
K League 1 players
K League 2 players
FC Seoul players
Ansan Mugunghwa FC players
Gwangju FC players
Seoul E-Land FC players
Expatriate footballers in England
South Korean expatriate sportspeople in England
Expatriate footballers in France
South Korean expatriate sportspeople in France